Night Letter is an album by saxophonist Sonny Stitt recorded in 1969 and released on the Prestige label. The album features Stitt using the varitone, an electronic amplification device which altered the saxophone's sound.

Reception
Allmusic reviewed the album stating "He plays with the usual surging intensity, but the album doesn't have as much excitement as similar dates done before and after it".

Track listing 
All compositions by Sonny Stitt except where noted
 "Night Letter" - 5:15   
 "When It's Sleepy Time Down South" (Clarence Muse, Leon René, Otis René) - 4:07
 "Stringin' the Jug" (Gene Ammons, Stitt) - 5:20   
 "Pretend" (Lew Douglas, Cliff Parman, Frank LeVere) - 3:45   
 "Blue String" - 6:20   
 "You'll Never Know" (Harry Warren, Mack Gordon) - 4:00   
 "Blues Walk" - 5:55

Personnel 
Sonny Stitt - tenor saxophone, varitone
Gene Ludwig - organ
Pat Martino - guitar 
Randy Gelispie - drums

References 

1969 albums
Prestige Records albums
Sonny Stitt albums
Albums recorded at Van Gelder Studio
Albums produced by Bob Porter (record producer)